The 2012 Copa del Rey Juvenil was the 62nd staging of the tournament. The competition began on 13 May and ended on 23 June with the final.

First round

|}

Quarterfinals

|}

Semifinals

|}

Final

See also
 2011–12 División de Honor Juvenil de Fútbol

External links
 Historical Spanish Juvenile Competition Results

Copa del Rey Juvenil de Fútbol
Juvenil